The Gem of Life (Traditional Chinese: 珠光寶氣) is a TVB grand production drama, that broadcast between October 2008 and February 2009. The series was specifically filmed to celebrate TVB's 41st Anniversary. Filming took place in many locations apart from Hong Kong, including Tibet, Taiwan, and France.

Synopsis

You may wish to be a famous socialite.
You may wish to have fame and fortune.
But is that really what you will wish for at the end?

The story centers around three sisters: Sylvia (oldest), Constance, and Jessica (youngest).

The series begins with Constance returning home. Her mother, SiuYau, had objected to her marriage so she eloped to Canada. Her husband Frankie now wants a divorce. To keep him, Constance hopes that Jessica, the wealthiest of the sisters, will lend her money so that Frankie can open a business. What Jessica's family didn't know was that her husband, Patrick, is facing losses in their company. Sylvia and her husband Tim are also facing problems: Their marriage is falling apart and Sylvia tries to keep it a secret from her family.

Jessica writes Constance a cheque so that she will leave. Their mother finds out Constance has returned and that her Frankie is a cheater. She interferes. The cheque bounces, the adultery is exposed, and Constance is forced to accept divorce. Meanwhile, Tim is discovered to have another family, and SiuYau exposes this adultery, causing Sylvia to divorce her husband as well. SiuYau is disappointed at the failures of her daughters' marriages and praises Jessica for marrying well and rich. Hearing this, Jessica helps Patrick seek tycoon Terrence in hopes that he will invest in their company. Terrence initially agrees but backs out the last minute. As Jessica and her husband panic, Calvin interferes. Like Terrence, Calvin owns an entertainment company and there has been a long rivalry between them. Calvin is disgusted by people who are born into the rich life, while he had to struggle in the streets before rising. Although he personally sets out to antagonize Terrence, Calvin secretly works for Martin, Terrence's father who wants his son to learn lessons in business as well as in life. Terrence and Calvin agree on a bet, if Terrence loses a boat race then he will have to invest in Patrick's failing company.

Unable to wait for the results, Jessica and her husband tricked Jessica's father into lending them all his money. Patrick then fakes death to stall his creditors, leaving Jessica with the financial burden. Despite Jessica's imminent bankruptcy, she continues to spend and go to balls. Constance catches her spending money at an expensive clothing shop and attempts to stop her. She accuses Jessica of tricking her own family for money, and Terrence hears them bickering. Jessica leaves Constance in tears, questioning the importance of wealth she sees an expensive dress and tries it on. When she is about to leave the sales lady informs her that Terrence had bought the dress for her. Knowing Terrence is a player, Constance chooses not to dwell on it. Later, on the day of the boat race Calvin is disqualified for cheating and Terrence wins. Wanting to help Jessica, kindhearted Constance seeks Terrence and tries to convince him to invest in her sister's company. He ignores her request, and she ends up following him to his boat. There's a storm and she ends up on his boat for seven days. The magazines quickly publish the story, and she catches the attention of Derek, a poor man who falls passionately for her.

Bankrupt, Jessica moves in with her family. She ends up working for Melissa who is a close friend of Martin. One of her first job assignments is to host the wives of some wealthy husbands. One of them, Mandy, plays a prank on Jessica, getting her to go on a boat ride with them and then leaving Jessica in the caves. Martin overhears Mandy talking about it and goes there to rescue her. They began dating even though he's older than her father. Nevertheless, Jessica is happy. She had purposely gone along with the wives' prank to catch Martin's attention.

To sign a contract with a celebrity Terrence has been courting, Calvin hires Sylvia to work for him. Sylvia initially thinks Calvin is a jerk after he pranks her several times, bullies other employees, and competes with Terrence to an unreasonable level. However, her image of Calvin changes when Sunny, Calvin's best friend and business partner, tells her more of his past. After learning that Calvin had to endure the mockery of his wealthy clients to retrieve a project she had wanted for her, Sylvia and Calvin become a couple. Almost as soon as it becomes public, Sunny quits his job. Employees gossip about how he must be jealous, given Sylvia's and Sunny's close friendship before she got together with Calvin, they speculate Sunny must have loved her. However, Sylvia finds out that Sunny is actually gay and secretly in love with Calvin, he feels ashamed and wants to leave. Sylvia assures him that he shouldn't, because Calvin would miss his best friend.

Terrence meets Constance at a cafe near the jewellery shop where she is a sales assistant. Convincing her to move forward, Constance accepts him as a friend and starts to date Derek, who is wealthier thanks to Calvin's sponsorship. Terrence offered a job as his secretary; she declined. When Constance's mother finds out she tries to convince Constance to work there, but emotions wasn't the biggest problem Constance faces — it is Elise, a spoiled, cunning woman who happens to be one of Terrence's closest friends. After nearly hitting Constance with her car, Derek sets it on fire, creating Elise's grudge against Constance. She sends Derek to jail and starts claiming that Constance's family is greedy for money and connections to the upper class. To confirm the claims, she tells Terrence that Constance's sister Jessica is dating his father for money. Terrence is already biased against Jessica ever since he overheard how she had tricked her own family for money, so he starts interfering in the relationship. When he tells Constance this, she defends her sister and becomes upset at Terrence. Not wanting to work for him, she finds a job in a Japanese company, but some time later this company is acquired by Terrence's.

For all of Elise's attempts, Jessica introduces Martin to her family anyway and her father is extremely upset. He tells his wife that he does not want Jessica's lover to be someone who is older than he is, the thought of that makes him sick. Eventually Melissa tells Martin that Jessica had set herself up to be rescued by him that time she was abandoned in the caves, so Martin breaks up with Jessica.

Devastated, Jessica leaves the country for a business trip and Constance starts work as Terrence's secretary. One day, Terrence confesses his feelings to Constance but she avoided him by saying she still remembers her husband and Derek. After much persistence, they start dating. However, at almost the same time Jessica returns with Martin. It was revealed that they had gotten married. This time when the parents find out it is SiuYau who storms away. Jessica reveals that her mother only objected to her relationship with Martin because she had wanted to set Constance and Terrence up. Because of this Constance knows she can't date Terrance any more. Sylvia knows her mother had set the stage now where Constance is guilted into staying away from Terrance, and decides to help her sister. Finally after some twists, Constance gains the courage to be with Terrence again, but Jessica is upset at what people would say about two sisters marrying a father and son.

Meanwhile, Sylvia begins to question her importance in Calvin's heart. They end up fighting; he suddenly has an asthma attack. She thinks it is one of his pranks and begins to leave. On realizing it is serious she can't find his medication. Sunny comes in just in time. She realizes that she is an incapable of taking care of Calvin, he needs Sunny more. Calvin takes her to meet his mom, but she has made her decision and breaks up with him. Despite this, Calvin is still in love with her, but they resume a professional attitude. The two of them eventually meet the new chairwoman of L'Ete Holdings, Catherine, who falls in love with Calvin. She knows that he is still in love with Sylvia but, more important, she knows how business-oriented the two were. Knowing that they wanted her because of her chairwoman position, she tells Sylvia to find a boyfriend and get married, only then will Catherine use her business to help Calvin.

Cast

The Hong family

The Ho family

The Shek family

The Sung family

The Ko family

Other cast

Awards and nominations

TVB Anniversary Awards (2009) 
 Best Drama
 Best Actor (Bowie Lam)
 Best Actress (Maggie Shiu)
 Best Actress (Gigi Lai)
 Best Actress (Ada Choi) - Top 5
 Best Supporting Actor (Elliot Ngok) - Top 5
 Best Supporting Actor (Kenny Wong)
 Best Supporting Actress (Linda Chung) - Top 5
 My Favourite Male Character (Moses Chan) - Top 5
 My Favourite Male Character (Bowie Lam)
 My Favourite Male Character (Kenny Wong)
 My Favourite Female Character (Maggie Shiu)
 My Favourite Female Character (Ada Choi)
 Most Improved Actress (Queenie Chu) - Top 5
 Most Improved Actress (Catherine Chau) - Top 5

15th Shanghai Television Festival 
 Best Actress: Ada Choi

Viewership ratings

References

External links
TVB.com The Gem of Life - Official Website 
K for TVB.net The Gem of Life - Episodic Summary and Screen Captures 

TVB dramas
2008 Hong Kong television series debuts
2009 Hong Kong television series endings